Perry Municipal Airport may refer to:

 Perry Municipal Airport (Iowa), in Perry, Iowa, United States (FAA: PRO)
 Perry Municipal Airport (Oklahoma), in Perry, Oklahoma, United States (FAA: F22)
 Perry County Municipal Airport in Tell City, Indiana, United States (FAA: TEL)

See also 
 Perry Airport (disambiguation)
 Perry County Airport (disambiguation)